Carolina Michaëlis de Vasconcelos, born Karoline Michaelis (15 March 1851 – 18 November 1925) was a German-Portuguese romanist.

Early life, education and private life
Michaelis was born in Berlin as the last of five children of Gustav Michaelis, a mathematics teacher.

In 1876 she married Joaquim António da Fonseca Vasconcelos, founder of Portuguese art history writing.

Academic career
In 1911, she became the first female professor in Romance studies and German studies, at the Faculdade de Letras at the university of Lisbon. She was one of the first women in Portugal who were concerned with women's subordinate status and in particular about improving the educational opportunities for Women in Portugal together with Francisca Wood, Maria Carvalho, Alice Pestana, Alice Moderno, Angelina Vidal, Antónia Pusich and Guiomar Torrezão.

Death, honours and commemoration
Michaëlis de Vasconcelos died in Porto in November 1925.

Several schools and streets have been named in her honour in both Portugal and Germany.

The Porto Metro station Carolina Michaelis is on lines A, B, C, E, or F.

In 2001 Portugal issued a postage stamp to commemorate her 150th anniversary.

Works
 Poesias de Sá de Miranda, (Poetry of Sá de Miranda), 1885
 História da Literatura Portuguesa, (History of Portuguese Literature), 1897
 A Infanta D. Maria de Portugal e as suas Damas (1521-1577), (The Infanta Maria of Portugal and her Ladies), 1902
 Cancioneiro da Ajuda (2 volumes), (Poetry Anthology of Ajuda) 1904
 Dicionário Etimológico das Línguas Hispânicas, (Etymological Dictionary of Hispanic Languages)
 Estudos sobre o Romanceiro Peninsular: Romances Velhos em Portugal, (Studies on the Peninsular Romanceiro: Old Romances in Portugal)
 As Cem Melhores Poesias Líricas da Língua Portuguesa, (The Hundred Best Lyric Poems of the Portuguese Language ), 1914
 A Saudade Portuguesa, (The Portuguese Nostalgia/Melancholy), 1914
 Notas Vicentinas: Preliminares de uma Edição Crítica das Obras de Gil Vicente, (Vincentian Notes: Preliminaries of a Critical Edition of the Works of Gil Vicente), 1920-1922
 Autos Portugueses de Gil Vicente y de la Escuela Vicentina, 1922
 Mil Provérbios Portugueses (A Thousand Portuguese Proverbs)

References

External links
 

1851 births
1925 deaths
People from Berlin
German emigrants to Portugal
German Hispanists
Academic staff of the University of Lisbon
People from the Province of Brandenburg
Portuguese women academics
German women anthropologists
Portuguese women anthropologists
German people of Portuguese descent